Michael Edward "Mike" Goddard  is a professorial fellow in animal genetics at the University of Melbourne, Australia.

Education
Goddard was educated at the University of Melbourne where he was awarded Bachelor of Veterinary Science (BVSc) and PhD degrees.

Awards and honours
Goddard was elected a Fellow of the Australian Academy of Science (FAA) in 2011.

He was elected a Fellow of the Royal Society (FRS) in 2015. His certificate of election reads: 

In 2018 he won the  John J. Carty Award for the Advancement of Science.

Selected publications

References

Living people
Fellows of the Royal Society
University of Melbourne alumni
Academic staff of the University of Melbourne
British geneticists
Australian geneticists
Fellows of the Australian Academy of Science
Year of birth missing (living people)